The following are the basketball events of the year 1960 throughout the world.
Tournaments include international (FIBA), professional (club) and amateur and collegiate levels.

Olympics
Basketball at the 1960 Summer Olympics
At the 1960 Summer Olympics, United States men's basketball team would go on to win the gold medal. Team USA was led by Hall of Famers Oscar Robertson and Jerry West.

NBA
1960 NBA Draft
1960 NBA Finals
1960 NBA Playoffs
1960 NBA All-Star Game
1959–60 NBA season
1960–61 NBA season

NBA awards
Most Valuable Player: Wilt Chamberlain, Philadelphia Warriors
Rookie of the Year: Wilt Chamberlain, Philadelphia Warriors
NBA All-Star Game MVP award:Wilt Chamberlain, Philadelphia Warriors

All-NBA First Team:
Wilt Chamberlain, Philadelphia Warriors
Bob Pettit, St. Louis Hawks
Gene Shue, Detroit Pistons
Bob Cousy, Boston Celtics
Elgin Baylor, Minneapolis Lakers

All-NBA Second Team:
Richie Guerin, New York Knicks
Bill Russell, Boston Celtics
Dolph Schayes, Syracuse Nationals
Bill Sharman, Boston Celtics
Jack Twyman, Cincinnati Royals

FIBA
FIBA South American Championship for Women 1960
1960–61 FIBA European Champions Cup
1959–60 FIBA Women's European Champions Cup
1960–61 FIBA Women's European Champions Cup

NAIA
1960 NAIA Basketball Tournament

NCAA
1960 NCAA Men's Division I Basketball Tournament
1960 National Invitation Tournament
1960 NCAA Men's Division II Basketball Tournament

International competition
1960 ABC Championship

Naismith Memorial Basketball Hall of Fame
Class of 1960:
Ernest Blood
Frank Keaney
Vic Hanson
Ward Lambert
Ed Macauley
Branch McCracken
Charles Murphy
John Wooden

Births
 January 12 - Dominique Wilkins, American basketball player
 March 8 - Buck Williams, American basketball player
 March 13 - Cliff Robinson, American basketball player
 June 12 – Joe Kopicki, American basketball player
 June 21 – Kevin Harlan, sports announcer
 August 6 - Dale Ellis, American basketball player
 August 18 - Fat Lever, American basketball player
 September 29 - John Paxson, American basketball player

Deaths
January 1 — Murray Greason, American college coach (Wake Forest) (born 1901)

References

External links 

 Basketball-Reference.com's 1970 NBA Playoffs page
 NBA History